This is a list of diplomatic missions in Oman. There are currently 57 embassies in Muscat and many countries maintain consulates in other Omani cities (not including honorary consulates).

Embassies in Muscat

Other posts in Muscat
 (Representative Office)


Accredited embassies
Resident in Abu Dhabi, United Arab Emirates

  
  
 
 
 
 
  
 

Resident in Cairo, Egypt

 
 
  
 
 
  

Resident in Doha, Qatar

  
 
 
 
 

Resident in Kuwait City, Kuwait

 
 
 
 
  
 

Resident in Riyadh, Saudi Arabia

 
 
  
 
  
 
 
 
  
 
  
 
 
  
  
 
  
  
 
 
  
 

Resident in other cities

  (London)
  (Algiers)
  (Rejkyavik)
  (London)
  (Canberra)
  (Addis Ababa)
  (Canberra)

See also
 Foreign relations of Oman
 Ministry of Foreign Affairs

References

External links
 Ministry of Foreign Affairs of Oman
 Diplomatic list

Diplomatic missions
Oman